Faisalabad Cricket Team was one of the eight regional first-class cricket clubs, based in Faisalabad, Pakistan. Its limited overs team was called Faisalabad Wolves. Kit colours are White for first-class cricket matches and Green for one-day and 20/20 competitions. They lost their first-class status when they were relegated from the 2016–17 Pakistan Super League. In April 2017, they regained their first-class status after beating Multan and as a result played in the 2017–18 Quaid-e-Azam Trophy tournament.

Honours
2003–04 Quaid-i-Azam Trophy

See also
 Pakistan Super League

References

External links
 Cricinfo
 2002-03 season review

Pakistani first-class cricket teams
Faisalabad